Petra Gáspár (born 13 February 1977) is a former Hungarian tennis player. On 16 September 1996, she reached a singles ranking high of world No. 165.

Representing Hungary in the Fed Cup, Gáspár has an overall record of 1–7.

ITF finals

Doubles: 3 (0–3)

Fed Cup participation

Singles

Doubles

External links
 
 
 

1977 births
Living people
Hungarian female tennis players